The 2000 South Carolina Gamecocks football team represented the University of South Carolina in the Southeastern Conference (SEC) during the 2000 NCAA Division I-A football season.  The Gamecocks were led by Lou Holtz in his second season as head coach and played their home games at Williams-Brice Stadium in Columbia, South Carolina.

South Carolina made one of the biggest turnarounds in college football history, going from a winless season in 1999 to an eight-win campaign in 2000. Their first win of the season, against New Mexico State, came two years to the day after their previous win, against Ball State on September 2, 1998.  South Carolina's turnaround in conference play was also one of the biggest in SEC history, going from 0–8 in 1999, to 5–3 in 2000 including a victory against a heavily favored Georgia team that ended the Gamecocks' SEC losing streak. South Carolina fans tore down the goalposts at Williams-Brice Stadium on both occasions in celebration. On New Year's Day 2001, the Gamecocks defeated Ohio State in the Outback Bowl in Tampa, Florida.  South Carolina finished the season ranked #19 in the AP Poll and #21 in the Coaches Poll.

Schedule

Roster

Coaching staff
 Lou Holtz, head coach
 Skip Holtz, offensive coordinator, quarterbacks
 Charlie Strong, defensive coordinator, defensive line
 Dave DeGuglielmo, offensive line
 John Gutekunst, defensive backs
 Oliver Pough running backs
 Dave Roberts, tight ends
 Chris Cosh, linebackers
 Todd Fitch, wide receivers
 Paul Lounsberry, offensive line

Rankings

References

South Carolina
ReliaQuest Bowl champion seasons
South Carolina Gamecocks football seasons
South Carolina Gamecocks football